John Arthur Fentener van Vlissingen (born 4 March 1939 in Utrecht) is a Dutch businessman. He is one of the wealthiest people in the Netherlands and has made major investments in the travel industry. The total capital of the family is, according to Quote magazine, around 9.2 billion euros. The wealth of Fentener van Vlissingen was  calculated to be €1.6 billion in Quote 500.

Of the three brothers (Frits, who died in March 2006, and Paul, who died in August 2006) only John Fentener van Vlissingen's career was not with the family company, SHV Holdings. He began his own company, BCD Holdings N.V., a market leader in the travel industry.

BCD Holdings began as a real estate company in 1975 as Property Management Advisory Services.  In 1976, the company was renamed  NORO since the name NIRO was already appropriated. In 1986 BCD was founded, after the separation of Noro management advisories and investments by the establishment of BCD. In 1987, WorldTravel Advisors was purchased. In 1999, WorldTravel Advisors merged with BTI Americas to form WorldTravel BTI.  In 2006, WorldTravel BTI was renamed  BCD Travel with the takeover of the German company, TQ3, and the dissolution of the BTI brand, thus creating the third largest travel company in the United States.

See also 
 BCD Travel

References

External links
 Website BCD Group
 Website BCD Travel
 Website Travix
 Website Park 'N Fly
 Website Airtrade
 Website ParkMobile International

1939 births
Living people
Businesspeople from Utrecht (city)
Dutch billionaires